The Portlandsebrug, known as the Netkous, is a bicycle and pedestrian bridge in Rotterdam and Albrandswaard crossing the A15 motorway and connects Rotterdam-Charlois with Rhoon.

References

Bridges completed in 2014
Cyclist bridges in the Netherlands
Steel bridges in the Netherlands
Bridges in Rotterdam